The Song of Marko Boçari from Suli is an Albanian polyphonic song of the early 19th century, narrating the death of Markos Botsaris, a Souliot leader.

History 

Markos Botsaris was a leader of the Souliotes. After the beginning of Greek War of Independence he became one of its central figures. He died in Karpenisi, modern western Greece in 1823 during a battle between Ottoman and Souliot forces.

Song 

The Song of Marko Boçari from Suli is a narrative and lament of his death. It contains more than 70 octosyllabic lines and was published about fifty years after the event by Thimi Mitko, an Albanian folklorist in his book Bleta Shqipëtare.

Lyrics 
Part of the lyrics:

Sources

See also 

Music of Albania

Albanian folk songs
Albanian folklore
Year of song unknown